Yacoub Artin (15 April 1842 – 21 January 1919) was an ethnic Armenian educator and scholar working in Egypt.

He was of Armenian descent, working for the Ministry of Public Education in 1888. It was noted in a period newspaper that he was one of many "non-Muslim" Egyptians working for the government at the time, a source of irritation among a segment of the population.  He was an Armenian Orthodox Christian, and once more in 1895 it was noted that a "non-Muslim" was in charge of education for a population that was predominately Muslim.

Works
 La proprieté foncière en Égypte, Cairo, 1883. Translated by Edward Abbott van Dyck as The right of landed property in Egypt, London, 1885.
 L'instruction publique en Egypte, Paris, 1890.
 (tr.) Contes populaires inédits de la vallée du Nil, Paris, 1895.
 Contribution à l'étude du blason en Orient, London, 1902.
 England in the Sudan, London: Macmillan, 1911. Translated from French by George Robb.

References

1842 births
1919 deaths
Armenian educators
20th-century Armenian writers
Egyptian people of Armenian descent
19th-century Egyptian writers
20th-century Egyptian educators
19th-century Armenian writers